Sheila Willis (born 11th June 1952) is a pioneer of the introduction of DNA profiling to the Irish legal system. She contributed to the establishment of the national DNA Database System in 2015.

Education
Willis attended University College Dublin graduating with PhD in Chemistry in 1977 and with DSc in Forensic Science in 2019.

Career
Sheila Willis is the president of the Chartered Society of Forensic Scientists.

She was a Director General of Forensic Science Ireland from 2002 to 2016. She received the UCD Alumni Award in Science in 2017. She is an honorary professor at the University of Dundee and the editor-in-chief of the Journal of Forensic Research, published by Hilaris, a subsidiary of the notorious predatory publisher, OMICS Publishing Group.

References 

1952 births
Living people
Forensic scientists
Irish women scientists
Alumni of University College Dublin